Salauddin Pappu is a Bangladeshi cricketer. He made his List A debut for Khelaghar Samaj Kallyan Samity in the 2016–17 Dhaka Premier Division Cricket League on 12 April 2017. On 12 March 2018, he scored his first century in List A cricket, batting for Legends of Rupganj against Kala Bagan Krira Chakra in the 2017–18 Dhaka Premier Division Cricket League. He made his Twenty20 debut for Legends of Rupganj in the 2018–19 Dhaka Premier Division Twenty20 Cricket League on 25 February 2019.

References

External links
 

Year of birth missing (living people)
Living people
Bangladeshi cricketers
Khelaghar Samaj Kallyan Samity cricketers
Legends of Rupganj cricketers
Place of birth missing (living people)